Yereymentau District is a district of Akmola Region in northern Kazakhstan. The administrative center of the district is the town of Yereymentau. Population:

Geography
Teniz and Kobeituz lakes are located in the district, not far from the Yereymentau Mountains.

References

External links

Districts of Kazakhstan
Akmola Region